The Cowin X3 is a compact CUV produced by the Chinese manufacturer Cowin Auto (subsidiary of Chery) since 2016.

Overview

The vehicle debuted as the Cowin i-CX concept at the Chengdu Auto Show in August 2014. 

The production car was unveiled at the Beijing Auto Show in April 2016 and is being sold in China since June 2016. The X3 is based on the Chery Tiggo 3 and has a spare wheel at the rear.

Powertrain
Like the Tiggo 3, the X3 is powered by a  1.6-litre petrol engine. The vehicle has a 5-speed manual transmission as standard, and a continuously variable transmission is available as an option. In 2021, a turbocharged 1.5-litre petrol engine with  added to the model range.

References

X3
Compact sport utility vehicles
Crossover sport utility vehicles
2020s cars
Cars introduced in 2016